The River Weaver Navigation Society is a waterway society concerned with the River Weaver, from Winsford to its confluence with the Manchester Ship Canal.

The Society is based at the Weaver Hall Museum and Workhouse, Northwich, Cheshire, it was founded in 1977 and has more than 100 members. Committee members attend meetings with navigation authorities, local government departments, and other waterways organisations.

Projects and activities
 Restoration of Frodsham Lock
 Development of Frodsham waterfront
 Replacement of Riversdale Bridge
 Encouragement of commercial traffic
 Reinstatement of all locks on the Weaver Navigation
 Improve interpretation 
 Restoration of mileposts and marker posts
 Improvement of water quality
 More access for pedestrians, horse riders, cyclists
 Boater-operated locks 
 Improving water, waste disposal, temporary mooring

See also
Association of Rivers Trusts (ART)
List of waterway societies in the United Kingdom

External links
UK Government, House of Commons Select Committee on Environment, Food and Rural Affairs: memorandum submitted by the River Weaver Navigation Society
River Weaver Navigation Trust's Final Report on the Milepost and Boundary Marker Project, undertaken with help from the Local Heritage Initiative
National Archives holding: Rules of the River Weaver Navigation Friendly Society, Northwich 1854
Warrington Guardian newspaper article: "Time to put river back on map", reporting research by RWNS
Salt Museum, Northwich, listing for RWNS
British Waterways' leisure website "Waterscape": listing for RWNS
Lecture Notes by Captain Rick Ferris on the River Weaver Navigation, commissioned by the Northwich Heritage Society
River Weaver Navigation Society website
images & map of mile markers seen along the River Weaver Navigation

Waterways organisations in England
Organisations based in Cheshire